The Great Perhaps is the fifth novel by Joe Meno. It was a winner of the Great Lakes Book Award for Fiction in 2009 and a New York Times Book Review Editor's Choice.

2009 American novels

Novels by Joe Meno
W. W. Norton & Company books